John Fingleton may refer to:

 Jack Fingleton (John Fingleton, 1908–1981) Australian cricketer and journalist
 John Fingleton (economist), Irish economist and former head of the Office for Fair Trading